Big 6 is the debut album by American trumpeter Blue Mitchell recorded in 1958 and released on the Riverside label. It contains the first recording of Benny Golson's jazz standard "Blues March".

Reception

The Allmusic review by Scott Yanow awarded the album 5 stars and stated "Mitchell is heard in excellent form in an all-star sextet".

Track listing

Recorded in New York City on July 2 & 3, 1958.

Personnel
Blue Mitchell - trumpet  
Curtis Fuller - trombone   
Johnny Griffin - tenor saxophone
Wynton Kelly - piano
Wilbur Ware - bass
Philly Joe Jones - drums

References

Riverside Records albums
Blue Mitchell albums
1958 debut albums
Albums produced by Orrin Keepnews